Keith Bailey may refer to:
 Keith Bailey (cricketer) (born 1964), Irish cricketer
 Keith Bailey (soccer) (born 1961), Canadian footballer